Covington County Courthouse is a historic county courthouse in Collins, Mississippi, county seat of Covington County, Mississippi. It was built in 1906, completed in 1907, and first used in 1908. The courthouse was added to the National Register of Historic Places on December 31, 1991. It is located on Dogwood Avenue.

See also
National Register of Historic Places listings in Mississippi#Covington County

References

County courthouses in Mississippi
Courthouses on the National Register of Historic Places in Mississippi
Government buildings completed in 1907
National Register of Historic Places in Covington County, Mississippi
Neoclassical architecture in Mississippi